Julie Brenta is a Belgian sound engineer and film editor. She has worked on over fifty films since 1995. 

Her credits include Murderous Maids (2000), L'Enfant (2005), Lorna's Silence (2008), The Nun (2013), Abuse of Weakness (2014), All About Them (2015), The Wakhan Front (2015), and Daguerrotype (2016). Her work on The Minister (2011) earned her a César Award and a Magritte Award for Best Sound. She also received two Magritte Awards for Best Editing for Keeper (2015) and Our Struggles (2018).

References

External links

Belgian audio engineers
Belgian film editors
Living people
César Award winners
Magritte Award winners
Year of birth missing (living people)